Chrysoritis trimeni, the Trimen's opal, is a species of butterfly in the family Lycaenidae. It is endemic to South Africa, where it is found in the Northern Cape.

The wingspan is 26–30 mm for males and 28–34 mm for females. Adults are on wing from August to March, with a peak in November.

References
Notes

Bibliography

Butterflies described in 1938
Chrysoritis
Endemic butterflies of South Africa
Taxa named by Norman Denbigh Riley
Taxonomy articles created by Polbot